Jerry Buckley may refer to:
Jerry Buckley (cartoonist)
Jerry Buckley (journalist)

See also
Gerald Buckley (disambiguation)